Wax was an American punk rock band from Los Angeles, California. Wax emerged during the pop punk resurgence of the early 1990s, and includes Joe Sib, Tom "Soda" Gardocki, Dave Georgeff, and Loomis Fall. The band is best known for their MTV buzz clip video "California", directed by Spike Jonze.

History
Wax formed in 1991 in Los Angeles, California. They released their first album, What Else Can We Do, on Caroline Records in 1992, with a surf-inflected punk rock style, comparable to the Ramones and Pixies. According to the liner notes, "Hold On" was the first song that the band ever wrote together. The album was produced by Daniel Rey at Convent Studios. Wax began a lasting relationship with Spike Jonze, who directed the music video for "Hush", filmed in Chicago, Illinois, where the majority of the band members originated prior to forming.

In 1995, the band issued its major label debut, 13 Unlucky Numbers, on Interscope/Atlantic, as well as a limited color vinyl version on the independent label Shattered Records, that also included a numbered gatefold sleeve and bonus track. Paul Q. Kolderie and Sean Slade acted as the production team for the sessions, recorded in the summer of 1993 at Fort Apache Studios. Spike Jonze was credited for the album's photography, and also directed two more music videos for the band. 

13 Unlucky Numbers included the single "California", whose music video was later called "infamous" by NME and has been included on Artforum's website. The video depicted a man on fire running in slow motion, and was quickly banned from daytime airplay on MTV. It was included on a retrospective DVD of the director, Spike Jonze, where a still from the video was also shown on the cover of the collection. The song was a moderate hit on American rock radio, reaching No. 28 on the Billboard Modern Rock charts in 1995. The album also included "Who Is Next", a song licensed to Nike for a commercial which featured Pete Sampras and Andre Agassi. The music video for the song featured Tim Armstrong and Lars Frederiksen of the band Rancid. On April 2, 1995, the band appeared on MTV's 120 Minutes to promote the release and perform live in the studio.

Wax was featured in several major motion pictures in the mid-1990s. Their song "Mallrats" appeared on the soundtrack of the 1995 Kevin Smith film Mallrats. In the movie itself, it is heard over the closing credits, just after "Susanne" by Weezer. The band briefly appeared in the 1996 film Bio-Dome, starring Pauly Shore and Stephen Baldwin, where they performed "He's a Whore", "Your Intelligence" and the Bobby Freeman song "Do You Wanna Dance?", during the party scene. The latter two songs appeared on the film's soundtrack. The band also contributed a cover of "Happy, Happy, Joy, Joy" to the cartoons' greatest hits album Saturday Morning, a song originally from The Ren & Stimpy Show.

After going their separate ways in 1995, Sib started the band 22 Jacks with Steve Soto of the Adolescents and Agent Orange, while continuing to develop his record label SideOneDummy. Gardocki went on to front Soda & His Million Piece Band, a Pogues-esque rock band who specialized in punk-inflected Americana and blues, and later played with Rose's Pawn Shop.  Georgeff started the Los Angeles indie rock combo Sign of the Fox. Loomis became a recurring cast member and writer on Jackass, appeared on Wildboyz, and was present in Jackass: The Movie, Jackass Number Two, Jackass 2.5, Jackass 3D, and Jackass 3.5, and he will also appear in the upcoming Jackass Forever. He also released two albums as Loomis, Black Black and Cigarette, as well as playing drums for Chris Pontius' band, Scream for Me.

Recent activity
In July 2009 Wax reunited, announcing the release of Hangin' On, a 7" vinyl record featuring four unreleased songs that were originally intended to appear on 13 Unlucky Numbers. The idea was inspired by Record Store Day and saw release on SideOneDummy, with all proceeds donated to UCP Wheels for Humanity. Wax played their first show in fourteen years at Riot Fest in Chicago, with Naked Raygun and Rights of the Accused, at The Metro on October 9, 2009, following a small warm-up show in Los Angeles at the Darkroom. Wax opened for long-time friends and contemporaries Weezer after being asked by the band to support them for their October 24, 2009 performance at the Hollywood Palladium to promote the then-upcoming Raditude album.

Band members
Joe Sib – lead vocals
Tom "Soda" Gardocki – guitars, vocals
Dave Georgeff – bass, vocals
Loomis Fall – drums, vocals

Discography

Studio albums

I  The LP version was issued on Shattered Records.

Extended plays and singles
 "Who Is Next" (1994) Side One
 "It Ain't Funny" (1994) Side One
 "Who Is Next" (1995) Interscope/Atlantic
 "California" (1995) Interscope/Atlantic
 "Hangin' On" (2009) Side One Dummy

Compilations and soundtracks
Mallrats (1995) MCA
Saturday Morning: Cartoons' Greatest Hits (1995) MCA
Bio-Dome (1996) Priority Records

References

Caroline Records artists
Interscope Records artists
Musical groups established in 1991
Musical groups disestablished in 2009
Musical groups from Los Angeles
Pop punk groups from California
1991 establishments in California
2009 disestablishments in California